Tom Jacobsen (born 1954) is a Norwegian former international footballer for Vålerenga and Ham-Kam.

Tom Jacobsen may also refer to:

Tom Rüsz Jacobsen (born 1953), Norwegian international football goalkeeper for Bryne and Vålerenga